Johannes Madsen is a Danish footballer who last played as a left winger for Fremad Amager in the Danish 1st Division.

References

External links

Johannes Madsen on Fremad Amager

Living people
1993 births
Danish men's footballers
Association football midfielders
FC Midtjylland players
Danish Superliga players